Bettina Zimmermann (born 31 March 1975) is a German model and actress. She has appeared in more than sixty films since 1999.

Selected filmography

References

External links 

1975 births
Living people
German film actresses
German television actresses
21st-century German actresses